The Organization of Iranian People's Fadaian (Majority) is an Iranian left-wing opposition political party in exile. The OIPFM advocates for an Iranian secular republic and the overthrow the current Islamic Republic of Iran government.

An offshoot of the Organization of Iranian People's Fedai Guerrillas, it was considered the largest communist organization of Iran from 1980 to 1991. The party currently holds Social democratic views.

See also

References

External links

1980 establishments in Iran
Banned political parties in Iran
Banned communist parties
Democratic socialist parties in Asia
History of the Islamic Republic of Iran
Political parties established in 1980
Progressive parties
Secularism in Iran
Social democratic parties in Asia
Socialist parties in Iran
Iranian organizations based in Germany